James Loughran (10 September 1897 – 25 October 1970) was an English footballer.

Loughran played for Easington Colliery, Hull City, Barrow, York City, Newark Town, Goole Town and Fulford United.

References

1897 births
1970 deaths
English footballers
Association football defenders
Association football midfielders
Easington Colliery A.F.C. players
Hull City A.F.C. players
Barrow A.F.C. players
York City F.C. players
Newark Town F.C. players
Goole Town F.C. players
English Football League players
Midland Football League players
Sportspeople from Seaham
Footballers from County Durham